The United States maintains close and productive relations with Jamaica.

History

Former Prime Minister Patterson visited Washington, DC, several times after assuming office in 1992. In April 2001, Prime Minister Patterson and other Caribbean leaders met with President George W. Bush during the Summit of the Americas in Quebec, Canada, at which a "Third Border Initiative" was launched to deepen U.S. cooperation with Caribbean nations and enhance economic development and integration of the Caribbean nations.  Portia Simpson Miller attended the "Conference on the Caribbean--A 20/20 Vision" in Washington in June 2007.

The United States is Jamaica's most important trading partner: bilateral trade in goods in 2005 was over $2 billion.  Jamaica is a popular destination for American tourists; more than 1.2 million Americans visited in 2006. In addition, some 10,000 American citizens, including many dual-nationals born on the island, permanently reside in Jamaica.

The Government of Jamaica also seeks to attract U.S. investment and supports efforts to create a Free Trade Area of the Americas (FTAA). More than 80 U.S. firms have operations in Jamaica, and total U.S. investment is estimated at more than $3 billion. An office of the U.S. and Foreign Commercial Service, located in the embassy, actively assists American businesses seeking trade opportunities in Jamaica. The country is a beneficiary of the Caribbean Basin Trade Partnership Act (CBTPA). The United States Chamber of Commerce, which also is available to assist U.S. business in Jamaica, has offices in Kingston.
U.S. Agency for International Development (USAID) assistance to Jamaica since its independence in 1962 has contributed to reducing the population growth rate, the attainment of higher standards in a number of critical health indicators, and the diversification and expansion of Jamaica's export base. USAID's primary objective is promoting sustainable economic growth. Other key objectives are improved environmental quality and natural resource protection, strengthening democratic institutions and respect for the rule of law, as well as family planning. In fiscal year 2006, the USAID mission in Jamaica operated a program totaling more than $21 million in development assistance.

The Peace Corps has been in Jamaica continuously since 1962. Since then, more than 3,300 volunteers have served in the country. Today, the Peace Corps works in the following projects: Youth-at-Risk, which includes adolescent reproductive health, HIV/AIDS education, and the needs of marginalized males; water sanitation, which includes rural waste water solutions and municipal waste water treatment; and environmental education, which helps address low levels of awareness and strengthens environmental nongovernmental organizations. The Peace Corps in Jamaica fields about 70 volunteers who work in every parish on the island, including some inner-city communities in Kingston.

Jamaica is a major transit point for cocaine en route to the United States and is also a key source of marijuana and marijuana derivative products for the Americas. During 2006, the Government of Jamaica seized narcotics destined for the United States, arrested key traffickers and criminal gang leaders, and dismantled their organizations. Jamaica remains the Caribbean's largest producer and exporter of marijuana. The efforts of the Jamaica Constabulary Force (JCF) and Jamaica Defense Force (JDF) enabled cannabis seizures to increase by over 200% in 2006. In 2006, the JCF arrested 5,409 persons on drug related charges, including 269 foreigners. Additionally, more than 20,000 kilograms of marijuana were seized, and 6,300,000 marijuana plants eradicated in 2006. Operation Kingfish is a multinational task force (Jamaica, U.S., United Kingdom, and Canada) for coordinating investigations leading to the arrest of major criminals. From its October 2004 inception through December 2006, Operation Kingfish launched 1,378 operations resulting in the seizure of 56 vehicles, 57 boats, one aircraft, 206 firearms, and two containers conveying drugs. Kingfish was also responsible for the seizure of over 13 metric tons of cocaine (mostly outside of Jamaica) and over 27,390 pounds of compressed marijuana. In 2006 Operation Kingfish mounted 870 operations, compared to 607 in 2005. In 2006, through cargo scanning, the Jamaican Customs Contraband Enforcement Team seized over 3,000 pounds of marijuana, ten kilograms of cocaine, and approximately $500,000 at Jamaican air and seaports.

Embassies 
Principal Jamaican officials:
 Ambassador-Audrey Marks
Principal U.S. officials:
 Ambassador—Luis G. Moreno
 Deputy Chief of Mission— Elizabeth Lee Martinez 
 Economic/Political Section Chief—Cleveland Charles
 USAID Mission Director—Denise Herbol
 Defense Attaché—LTC Brian D Harris
 Chief, Military Liaison Office—LTC Brian D Harris
 Consul General—Michael Schimmel
 Public Affairs Officer—Joshua Polacheck
 Peace Corps Director—Jennifer White

Diplomatic missions
The U.S. embassy in Jamaica is in Kingston, as are the USAID Mission and the Peace Corps headquarters.

The Embassy of Jamaica is located in Washington, D.C. The government of Jamaica also maintains three consulates in Miami, Florida and New York City.

See also 
Jamaican Americans
North American Union
North American Free Trade Agreement
Free Trade Area of the Americas
Third Border Initiative
Caribbean Community
Caribbean Basin Initiative (CBI)
Caribbean Basin Trade Partnership Act
Western Hemisphere Travel Initiative
Foreign relations of the United States
Foreign relations of Jamaica

References

External links
History of Jamaica - U.S. relations
The United States Department of State - Jamaica
The Embassy of the United States of America

 
Bilateral relations of the United States
United States